Esu Evert Niemelä (16 June 1921 – 30 November 1999) was a Finnish farmer and politician. 

Niemelä was born in Sääminki. He was a member of the Parliament of Finland from 1958 to 1972, representing the Agrarian League (which changed its name to Centre Party in 1965).

References

1921 births
1999 deaths
People from Savonlinna
Centre Party (Finland) politicians
Members of the Parliament of Finland (1958–62)
Members of the Parliament of Finland (1962–66)
Members of the Parliament of Finland (1966–70)
Members of the Parliament of Finland (1970–72)